Farashganj is a neighborhood in Dhaka, Bangladesh. The name comes from the Bengali word for French which is Forashi and ganj, meaning market-town.

History 
Farashganj literally means French town, it takes its name from French merchants based in Dhaka city. In 1740 the French East India Company started operations in Dhaka and built their "Kuthi" near Ahsan Manzil Palace with permission from Nowazish Mohammad Khan. The French got into minor conflicts with the British over a factory but was resolved through the mediation of Naib Nazim Jasarat Khan. The French merchants established wholesale trading posts for spices like raw turmeric, ginger, garlic and chilli. They built fine residences such as the Ruplal House.

In the late nineteenth century, an influx of lumber-yards and wooden furniture manufacturers made the neighborhood, "the new furniture centre of Dacca".

Geography 
Farashganj is located on the northern bank of the Buriganga River in Old Dhaka. Its principal thoroughfares are B. K. Das Road and Ahsanullah Road.

Points of interest 
There are a number of historic buildings in Farashganj, mostly dilapidated. The stately two-story riverside mansion Ruplal House is now occupied by squatters. The once magnificent 19th-century mansion Bara Bari, with its ornate curved balconies over the street, has been partly demolished.

Loharpul bridge also located in Farashganj.  It was a great engineering feat at that time. In 1832 the collector of Dhaka, Mr. Walter put up work for a single-span hanging bridge over the canal at Sutrapur (Farashganj) for facilitating passage from Dhaka to Narayanganj.

References

Further reading
 
 
 

Old Dhaka
Neighbourhoods in Dhaka
Ethnic enclaves in Asia